Aliabad (also Romanized as ‘Alīābād) is a village in Chahdegal Rural District, Negin Kavir District, Fahraj County, Kerman Province, Iran. At the 2006 census, its population was 25, in 6 families.

References 

Populated places in Fahraj County